Robert Maclaughlin Farr (1936 - 2013) was a social psychologist from Northern Ireland who played an important role in introducing social representation theory to Britain.

Life
Rob Farr was born in Northern Ireland in 1936 where he gained a BSc (1957) and MSc (1959) in Psychology from Queen's University Belfast. After this he studied for a period at Trinity College Dublin and then in 1962 returned to Queen's University as an assistant lecturer. In 1964, he took a post as researcher with the Royal Air Force before taking up a post as a lecturer in social psychology at University College London in 1966. In 1977, he was awarded a PhD by Birkbeck, University of London for a thesis entitled The social psychology of selection: a theoretical model of man and a conceptual framework for research

In 1979 he was appointed Chair of Psychology at the University of Glasgow but did not stay there for long. In 1983 he was appointed Chair of Social Psychology at the London School of Economics and returned to London. His inaugural lecture was entitled Some reflections on the historical development of psychology as an experimental and social science (Farr, 1985).  He remained at that institution until he retired in 2000. He had a lasting impact on what became the Department of Psychological and Behavioural Science which awards a prize each year in his name.  
 
He was active in the British Psychological Society of which he was elected president in 1986. His Presidential address was entitled The Science of Mental Life: A social psychological analysis in which he championed the work of George Herbert Mead (Farr, 1987).

Research
While he was at University College London he spent a sabbatical year in Paris working with Serge Moscovici. He returned enthused with the ideas of social representation theory and spent the remainder of his career developing and promoting these ideas (see Farr & Moscovici, 1984; Markova & Farr, 1995; Wagner, 2020).

He had a continuing interest in the development of social psychology and published a collection of his articles on this topic in 1996 (Farr, 1996). He planned to publish a book entitled A Social and Reflexive Model of Man: Theory and Evidence. The Wellcome Library contains his correspondence with Henri Tajfel about this book and a manuscript draft.

Publications
 Farr, R.M. (1996). The Roots of Modern Social Psychology. Oxford: Blackwell.
 Farr, R.M. (1987). The Science of Mental Life: A social psychological analysis. Bulletin of the British Psychological Society, 40, 1–17.
 Farr, R.M. (1985). Some reflections on the historical development of psychology as an experimental and social science: Inaugural lecture. London: LSE.
 Farr, R.M., Moscovici, S. (Eds.). (1984). Social Representations. Cambridge: Cambridge University Press.
 Markova, I., & Farr, R.M. (eds) (1995) Representations of Health and Illness and Handicap. Chur: Harwood Academic.

Awards
 1986 - President, British Psychological Society
 1981 - Member, Academia Europaea (Behavioural Sciences Section)

References

1936 births
2013 deaths
British psychologists
Presidents of the British Psychological Society
Social psychologists
Academics of the London School of Economics